WFRB-FM is a Country formatted broadcast radio station licensed to Frostburg, Maryland, United States, serving Central Maryland, Western Maryland, Potomac Highlands of West Virginia and South-Central Pennsylvania.  WFRB-FM is owned and operated by Forever Media.

References

External links
 Big Froggy 105-3 WFRB Online
 

1965 establishments in Maryland
FRB-FM
Radio stations established in 1965
FRB